Sergey Vladimirovich  Shnurov (born 13 April 1973) is a Russian musician and songwriter, best known as Shnur (lit. cord), of the ska-punk band Leningrad which he formed in 1997. The group disbanded between 2008 and 2010, during which time Shnur formed Rubl with other members of Leningrad.

Three of Shnur's songs featured on the Everything Is Illuminated soundtrack: Звезда рок-н-ролла (Rock-n-Roll Star), Дикий мужчина (Wild Man), and Маленький мальчик (A Little Boy). Shnurov also composed music for many other movies, including the Russian cult film Bumer and its sequel. 

Art critic Artyom Rodnaryov thinks that the main audience of Shnurov are clerks who need someone to channel their aggression. Most of the Shnur's songs excessively use obscene words and have a very simple composition, thus fulfilling this function. In 2016, Shnurov reported the highest income of all singers in Russia ($11 million). In 2017, he was on the cover of the Russian edition of Forbes.

After the 2022 Russian invasion of Ukraine, he appeared in a music video on YouTube suggesting that to be a Russian was equivalent to having been a Jew in 1944 in Germany during WWII. It is unclear if the text is to be understood as ironic criticism or support of Russians abroad lamenting purported anti-Russian sentiment.  He also left his post as producer at the international Russian language channel RTVI, citing as a reason possible differences in opinion around the situation.

See also 
 Leningrad (band)

References

External links 

 
 Sergey Shnurov in Forbes

1973 births
Living people
Musicians from Saint Petersburg
Singers from Saint Petersburg
Russian musicians
Russian rock singers
Russian television presenters
Russian punk rock musicians
Russian male actors
Russian male voice actors
Russian film score composers
Recipients of the Nika Award
21st-century Russian singers
Male film score composers
21st-century Russian male singers
Russian National Music Award winners